ent-Cassa-12,15-diene synthase (EC 4.2.3.28, OsDTC1, OsKS7) is an enzyme with systematic name ent-copalyl-diphosphate diphosphate-lyase (ent-cassa-12,15-diene-forming). This enzyme catalyses the following chemical reaction

 ent-copalyl diphosphate  ent-cassa-12,15-diene + diphosphate

This class I diterpene cyclase produces ent-cassa-12,15-diene, a precursor of the rice phytoalexins (-)-phytocassanes A-E.

References

External links 
 

EC 4.2.3